Ghana–Israel relations refers to the bilateral relations between Ghana and Israel. Ghana–Israel relations dates back to the mid-1950s after Israel offered support to develop the Ghanaian armed forces. However, following the 1973 Yom Kippur War, Ghana severed relationships with Israel. In 2011, Ghana and Israel resumed formal relations and opened embassies in the Tel Aviv District city of Ramat Gan  and Accra respectively, the Israeli embassy in Nigeria was the only known conduit of engagement between the two countries.

History
An Israeli consulate was established in Ghana in 1956, prior to independence. Ghana was the first country from Sub-Saharan Africa to establish diplomatic relations with Israel.

In April 1959, Israel, with help from India, supervised the establishment of the Ghana Air Force. A small Israeli team also trained aircraft maintenance personnel and radio technicians at the Accra-based Air Force Trade Training School. Although the British persuaded Ghanaian President Kwame Nkrumah to withdraw Israeli advisers in 1960, Ghanaian pilots continued to receive some training at aviation schools in Israel. After Nkrumah's overthrow, Israeli military activities in Ghana ended, but Israel continued to aid Ghana in shipping, construction, security, research, manpower training, and agriculture.

From shortly after the Yom Kippur War through September 2011, Israel and Ghana maintained basic diplomatic ties through Nigeria. In September 2011, Ghana and Israel renewed direct diplomatic relations.

Trade
In October 2004, a four-day Israeli trade fair titled "Applicable Technologies Fair 2004" occurred in Accra, Ghana. Ghanaian Minister of Trade and Industry Alan John Kyerematen urged investors to undertake mutual investments including in irrigation and agriculture.

Gallery

References

External links
 Ghana Israel Chamber of Commerce
 United Friends of Israel inaugurated Ghana Web, 10 June 2000
 Israel Pledges To Assist Ghana Daily Graphic, 8 September 2009

 
Israel
Bilateral relations of Israel